In mathematics, specifically in local class field theory, the Hasse–Arf theorem is a result concerning jumps of the upper numbering filtration of the Galois group of a finite Galois extension.  A special case of it when the residue fields are finite  was originally proved by Helmut Hasse, and the general result was proved by Cahit Arf.

Statement

Higher ramification groups

The theorem deals with the upper numbered higher ramification groups of a finite abelian extension L/K.  So assume L/K is a finite Galois extension, and that vK is a discrete normalised valuation of K, whose residue field has characteristic p > 0, and which admits a unique extension to L, say w.  Denote by vL the associated normalised valuation ew of L and let  be the valuation ring of L under vL.  Let L/K have Galois group G and define the s-th ramification group of L/K for any real s ≥ −1 by

So, for example, G−1 is the Galois group G.  To pass to the upper numbering one has to define the function ψL/K which in turn is the inverse of the function ηL/K defined by

The upper numbering of the ramification groups is then defined by Gt(L/K) = Gs(L/K) where s = ψL/K(t).

These higher ramification groups Gt(L/K) are defined for any real t ≥ −1, but since vL is a discrete valuation, the groups will change in discrete jumps and not continuously.  Thus we say that t is a jump of the filtration {Gt(L/K) : t ≥ −1} if Gt(L/K) ≠ Gu(L/K) for any u > t.  The Hasse–Arf theorem tells us the arithmetic nature of these jumps.

Statement of the theorem
With the above set up, the theorem states that the jumps of the filtration {Gt(L/K) : t ≥ −1} are all rational integers.

Example 
The theorem says that there exist positive integers  such that

...

Non-abelian extensions

For non-abelian extensions the jumps in the upper filtration need not be at integers. Serre gave an example of a totally ramified extension with Galois group the quaternion group Q8 of order 8 with
G0 = Q8
G1 = Q8
G2 = Z/2Z
G3 = Z/2Z
G4 = 1
The upper numbering then satisfies
Gn = Q8 for n≤1
Gn =  Z/2Z for 1<n≤3/2
Gn = 1 for 3/2<n
so has a jump at the non-integral value n=3/2.

Notes

References

 

Galois theory
Theorems in algebraic number theory